The Inspection Board of Finance in Turkey is an institution in the field of investigating, searching for, and suppressing corrupt financial sources.

History

The Board was set up in 1879, during attempts to rearrange and improve the financial administration of the Ottoman Era, with the purpose of ensuring that all financial transactions were audited and inspected by an authorized board under the authority of the Minister of Finance.

References 

1879 establishments in the Ottoman Empire
Government of Turkey